Lawrence Greenspon is an Ottawa-based lawyer.  

Greenspon was born and raised in Montreal and moved to Ottawa in 1974; he became a civil libertarian before commencing his legal work.

Greenspon is a partner in the Ottawa firm Greenspon Granger Hill and is a certified specialist in both criminal defence and civil litigation. He has been involved in the defence of a number of high-profile cases. In August 2017, Senator Mike Duffy announced that he would sue the Senate of Canada and the RCMP for $8 million in lost income and general damages because of his suspension and hired Greenspon to represent him.

Greenspon is heavily involved in fund raising campaigns for the Jewish National Fund of Ottawa. He is also involved with Reach Canada, and is on the boards of the Snowsuit Fund and Youth Services Bureau Foundation, chairing Child and Youth Friendly Ottawa, and volunteering with the Ottawa Children's Treatment Centre, according to the Ottawa Business Journal. He was the cabinet chair for the Montfort Hospital successful fund raising campaign to purchase a $2.5-million CT Scanner.

He is a past chair of the Ottawa Jewish Community Centre and the United Way Community Services Cabinet and has received several honours, including a Lifetime Achievement from Volunteer Ottawa and the Community Builder of the Year Award by the United Way.

Greenspon is divorced from his first wife and has a 1 daughter, Maja. He subsequently married Angela Lariviere in July 2015.

On January 3, 2018, the lawyer representing Joshua Boyle said that the defendant planned to have Greenspon and partner Eric Granger take over the defence against 15 criminal charges. Boyle is a high-profile defendant because he and his family had been released after five years of captivity in Afghanistan only months before his arrest for offences alleged to have been committed in Ottawa.

In 2022, Greenspon represented the family of a 14-year old boy who climbed through City of Ottawa-erected fencing at the disused Prince of Wales Bridge and drowned after jumping into the Ottawa River. The family filed a $1.5 million lawsuit against the City alleging that it was negligent for not taking effective steps to stop such incidents at the bridge.

References

https://ottawacitizen.com/entertainment/Lawrence+Greenspon+honoured+volunteer+spirit/7212070/story.html

External links
 
 

Living people
Anglophone Quebec people
Canadian Jews
Lawyers in Ontario
Lawyers from Montreal
People from Ottawa
Year of birth missing (living people)